The 9mobile Prize for Literature (formerly the Etisalat Prize for Literature 2013–16) was created by Etisalat Nigeria in 2013, and is the first ever pan-African prize celebrating first-time African writers of published fiction books. Awarded annually, the prize aims to serve as a platform for the discovery of new creative talent out of the continent and invariably promote the burgeoning publishing industry in Africa. The winner receives a cash prize of £15,000 in addition to a fellowship at the University of East Anglia.

The 9mobile Prize for Literature also aims to support publishers by purchasing 1000 copies of all shortlisted books, to be donated to various schools, book clubs and libraries across the African continent.

In 2017, Etisalat Nigeria renamed itself 9mobile and the award name changed at the same time.

Entry and prize
The 9mobile Prize for Literature celebrates new writers of African citizenship whose first fiction book (more than 30,000 words in length) was published in the previous 24 months. The prize accepts any printed production in book form of any type or genre, written in English or published in English translation. Authors and their publishers can be based anywhere in the world.

The winner of the 9mobile Prize for Literature receives £15,000, a Samsung Galaxy Note and an engraved Montblanc Meisterstück. In line with the prize's vision of promoting upcoming writers, 9mobile sponsors a book tour to three African cities for the winning writer and shortlisted writers. The winning writer is also awarded the 9mobile Fellowship at the University of East Anglia, mentored by Professor Giles Foden, which includes significant opportunities to meet other writers, publishers and work on a second book. Shortlisted writers win a Samsung Galaxy Note and also embark on a book tour to two major African cities.

The 9mobile Prize has a board of patrons (in addition to the judges) who are mostly writers, academics, publishers and critics. Patrons are carefully selected based on professional excellence and a relationship with the African writing industry. Those who have served as patrons are:

Ama Ata Aidoo, writer, playwright and academic (2013–)
Dele Olojede, journalist, winner of Pulitzer Prize (2013–)
Ellah Wakatama Allfrey, OBE, editor and literary critic (2013–)
Kole Omotoso, writer (2013–16)
Margaret Busby, OBE, writer, editor and publisher (2013–)
Sarah Ladipo Manyika, writer and academic (2016–)
Zakes Mda, novelist and playwright (2013–)

Award history
Blue ribbon = winner

2013
From a longlist of nine titles, the shortlist was announced on 23 January 2014. The winner was announced on 23 February 2014, and the award ceremony took place on Sunday, 2 March, at the Federal Palace Hotel, Lagos.

Yewande Omotoso (South Africa), Bom Boy (Modjaji Books, South Africa)
Karen Jennings (South Africa), Finding Soutbek (Holland Park Press, UK)
 NoViolet Bulawayo (Zimbabwe), We Need New Names (Little, Brown and Company/Chatto & Windus, UK)

The judges in 2013 were:

Zakes Mda, novelist and playwright
Sarah Ladipo Manyika, writer, academic
Pumla Dineo Gqola, writer, academic
Billy Kahora, writer, editor of Kwani?

2014
The longlist was announced in November 2014 and the shortlist in December 2014. The winner was announced on Sunday, 15 March 2015, at the Intercontinental Hotel Lagos, Nigeria.

 Nadia Davids (South Africa), An Imperfect Blessing (Random House Struik-Umuzi, South Africa)
 Chinelo Okparanta (Nigeria), Happiness, Like Water (Granta Books, UK)
  Songeziwe Mahlangu (South Africa), Penumbra (Kwela Books, imprint of NB Publishers, South Africa)

The 2014 judges were:

 Sarah Ladipo Manyika (chair)
 Alain Mabanckou
 Jamal Mahjoub
 Tsitsi Dangarembga

2015
The longlist was announced on 3 December 2015. The shortlist was announced on 8 March 2016, and the winner on 19 March.

Penny Busetto (South Africa), The Story of Anna P, as Told by Herself (Jacana Media, South Africa)
 Fiston Mwanza Mujila (Democratic Republic of Congo), Tram 83, translated by Roland Glasser (Deep Vellum, USA)
Rehana Rossouw (South Africa), What Will People Say (Jacana Media, South Africa)

The 2015 judges were:
 Ato Quayson (chair)
 Molara Wood
 Zukiswa Wanner

2016
The longlist of nine titles was announced on 23 November 2016 and the shortlist of three on 5 January 2017. The winner was announced on 20 May. 
 Jacqui L’Ange (South Africa), The Seed Thief (Umuzi Publishers, South Africa)
  Jowhor Ile (Nigeria), And After Many Days (Kachifo Limited, Nigeria)
Julie Iromuanya (Nigeria), Mr & Mrs Doctor (Coffee House Press, USA)

The 2016 judges were:
 Helon Habila (chair)
 Edwige-Renée Dro
 Elinor Sisulu

See also 
 Nigeria Prize for Literature
 Etisalat Award for Arabic Children's Literature
 Grand Prix of Literary Associations

References

External links
 9mobile Prize for Literature  official website
 Prisca Sam-Duru, "Echoes from Etisalat Prize for Literature", Vanguard, 8 March 2014.

African literary awards
Nigerian literary awards
Awards established in 2013
2013 establishments in Nigeria
First book awards
Fiction awards
English-language literary awards